Black Tide is a 2018 French film directed by Érick Zonca, and starring Vincent Cassel, Romain Duris and Sandrine Kiberlain in lead roles. It was adapted from Israeli writer Dror Mishani's book, The Missing File.

Cast
 Vincent Cassel as François Visconti
 Romain Duris as Yann Bellaile
 Sandrine Kiberlain as Solange Arnault

Reception  
The film received mixed reviews, who praised it for its impressive character study.

References

External links

2018 films